Capensinidin (Cp) is an O-methylated anthocyanidin. It is a water-soluble, blue-red plant dye. It is a 5-methoxy analog of malvidin, has been obtained from Plumbago capensis.

References

O-methylated anthocyanidins